BiXian Panic (Chinese title: 笔仙惊魂) is a 2012 Chinese horror film directed by David Kuan.

Cast
Zak Di as Xiao Wu
 Wang Yi as Mu Fan
He Dujuan as Liu Sisi
Chai Biyun as Ling Feier
Wu Ma as Qiao

References

Chinese supernatural horror films
2012 horror films
2012 films
Films directed by Guan Er